Arvada, Colorado is the seventh-most-populous city in Colorado.

Arvada may also refer to:
 Arvada, Wyoming, an unincorporated community in the US
 Arvada, Arizona, an unincorporated community that shares a post office with Scenic, Arizona, US

See also